In mathematics, the Plancherel theorem for spherical functions is an important result in the representation theory of semisimple Lie groups, due in its final form to Harish-Chandra. It is a natural generalisation in non-commutative harmonic analysis of the Plancherel formula and Fourier inversion formula in the representation theory of the group of real numbers in classical harmonic analysis and has a similarly close interconnection with the theory of differential equations.
It is the special case for zonal spherical functions of the general Plancherel theorem for semisimple Lie groups, also proved by Harish-Chandra. In the case of hyperbolic space, these expansions were known from prior results of Mehler, Weyl and Fock.

History
The first versions of an abstract Plancherel formula for the Fourier transform on a unimodular locally compact group G were due to Segal and Mautner. At around the same time, Harish-Chandra and Gelfand & Naimark derived an explicit formula for SL(2,R) and complex semisimple Lie groups, so in particular the Lorentz groups. A simpler abstract formula was derived by Mautner for a "topological" symmetric space G/K corresponding to a maximal compact subgroup K. Godement gave a more concrete and satisfactory form for positive definite spherical functions, a class of special functions on G/K. Since when G is a semisimple Lie group these spherical functions φλ were naturally labelled by a parameter λ in the quotient of a Euclidean space by the action of a finite reflection group, it became a central problem to determine explicitly the Plancherel measure in terms of this parametrization. Generalizing the ideas of Hermann Weyl from the spectral theory of ordinary differential equations, Harish-Chandra introduced his celebrated c-function c(λ) to describe the asymptotic behaviour of the spherical functions φλ and proposed c(λ)−2 dλ as the Plancherel measure. He verified this formula for the special cases when G is complex or real rank one, thus in particular covering the case when G/K is a hyperbolic space. The general case was reduced to two conjectures about the properties of the c-function and the so-called spherical Fourier transform. Explicit formulas for the c-function were later obtained for a large class of classical semisimple Lie groups by Bhanu-Murthy. In turn these formulas prompted Gindikin and Karpelevich to derive a product formula for the c-function, reducing the computation to Harish-Chandra's formula for the rank 1 case. Their work finally enabled Harish-Chandra to complete his proof of the Plancherel theorem for spherical functions in 1966.

In many special cases, for example for complex semisimple group or the Lorentz groups, there are simple methods to develop the theory directly. Certain subgroups of these groups can be treated by techniques generalising the well-known "method of descent" due to Jacques Hadamard. In particular  gave a general method for deducing properties of the spherical transform for a real semisimple group from that of its complexification.

One of the principal applications and motivations for the spherical transform was Selberg's trace formula. The classical Poisson summation formula combines the Fourier inversion formula on a vector group with summation over a cocompact lattice. In Selberg's analogue of this formula, the vector group is replaced by G/K, the Fourier transform by the spherical transform and the lattice by a cocompact (or cofinite) discrete subgroup. The original paper of  implicitly invokes the spherical transform; it was  who brought the transform to the fore, giving in particular an elementary treatment for SL(2,R) along the lines sketched by Selberg.

Spherical functions

Let G be a semisimple Lie group and K a maximal compact subgroup of G. The Hecke algebra Cc(K \G/K), consisting of compactly supported K-biinvariant continuous functions on G, acts by convolution on the Hilbert space H=L2(G / K). Because G / K is a symmetric space, this *-algebra is commutative.

If S denotes the commutant of a set of operators S on H, then  can be identified with the commutant of the regular representation of G on H. Now  leaves invariant the subspace H0 of K-invariant vectors in H. Moreover, the abelian von Neumann algebra it generates on H0 is maximal Abelian. By spectral theory, there is an essentially unique measure μ on the locally compact space X and a unitary transformation U between H0 and L2(X, μ) which carries the operators in  onto the corresponding multiplication operators.

The transformation U is called the spherical Fourier transform or sometimes just the spherical transform and μ is called the Plancherel measure. The Hilbert space H0 can be identified with L2(K\G/K), the space of K-biinvariant square integrable functions on G.

The spherical functions φλ on G are given by Harish-Chandra's formula:

{| border="1" cellspacing="0" cellpadding="5"
|
|}

In this formula:

 the integral is with respect to Haar measure on K;
 λ is an element of A* =Hom(A,T) where A is the Abelian vector subgroup in the Iwasawa decomposition G =KAN of G;
 λ' is defined on G by first extending λ to a character of the solvable subgroup AN, using the group homomorphism onto A, and then setting  for k in K and x in AN, where ΔAN is the modular function of AN.
 Two different characters λ1 and λ2 give the same spherical function if and only if λ1 = λ2·s, where s is in the Weyl group of A  the quotient of the normaliser of A in K by its centraliser, a finite reflection group.

It follows that

 X can be identified with the quotient space A*/W.

Spherical principal series

The spherical function φλ can be identified with the matrix coefficient of the spherical principal series of G. If M is the centralizer of A in K, this is defined as the unitary representation πλ of G induced by the character of B = MAN given by the composition of the homomorphism of MAN onto A and the character λ.
The induced representation is defined on functions f on G with

for b in B by

where

The functions f can be identified with functions in L2(K / M) and

As  proved, the representations of the spherical principal series are irreducible and two representations πλ and πμ are unitarily equivalent if and only if μ = σ(λ) for some σ in the Weyl group of A.

 Example: SL(2, C) 
The group G = SL(2,C) acts transitively on the quaternionic upper half space

by Möbius transformations. The complex matrix

acts as

The stabiliser of the point j is the maximal compact subgroup K = SU(2), so that  It carries the G-invariant Riemannian metric

with associated volume element

and Laplacian operator

Every point in  can be written as k(etj) with k in SU(2) and t determined up to a sign. The Laplacian has the following form on functions invariant under SU(2), regarded as functions of the real parameter t:

The integral of an SU(2)-invariant function is given by

Identifying the square integrable SU(2)-invariant functions with L2(R) by the unitary transformation Uf(t) = f(t) sinh t, Δ is transformed into the operator

By the Plancherel theorem and Fourier inversion formula for R, any SU(2)-invariant function f can be expressed in terms of the spherical functions

by the spherical transform

and the spherical inversion formula

For biinvariant functions this establishes the Plancherel theorem for spherical functions: the map

The spherical function Φλ is an eigenfunction of the Laplacian:

Schwartz functions on R are the spherical transforms of functions f belonging to the Harish-Chandra Schwartz space

By the Paley-Wiener theorem, the spherical transforms of smooth SU(2)-invariant functions of compact support are precisely
functions on R which are restrictions of holomorphic functions on C satisfying an exponential growth condition

The representation is given by the formula

The function

is fixed by SU(2) and

The representations πλ are irreducible and unitarily equivalent only when the sign of λ is changed. The map W of  onto  (with measure λ2 dλ on the first factor) given by

 Example: SL(2, R) 
The group G = SL(2,R) acts transitively on the Poincaré upper half plane

by Möbius transformations. The real matrix

acts as

The stabiliser of the point i is the maximal compact subgroup K = SO(2), so that  = G / K.
It carries the G-invariant Riemannian metric

with associated area element

and Laplacian operator

Every point in  can be written as k( et i ) with k in SO(2) and t determined up to a sign. The Laplacian has the following form on functions invariant under SO(2), regarded as functions of the real parameter t:

The integral of an SO(2)-invariant function is given by

There are several methods for deriving the corresponding eigenfunction expansion for this ordinary differential equation including:

 the classical spectral theory of ordinary differential equations applied to the hypergeometric equation (Mehler, Weyl, Fock);
 variants of Hadamard's method of descent, realising 2-dimensional hyperbolic space as the quotient of 3-dimensional hyperbolic space by the free action of a 1-parameter subgroup of SL(2,C);
 Abel's integral equation, following Selberg and Godement;
 orbital integrals (Harish-Chandra, Gelfand & Naimark).

The second and third technique will be described below, with two different methods of descent: the classical one due Hadamard, familiar from treatments of the heat equation and the wave equation on hyperbolic space; and Flensted-Jensen's method on the hyperboloid.

Hadamard's method of descent

then

Since the action of SL(2,C) commutes with Δ3, the operator M0 on S0(2)-invariant functions obtained by averaging M1f by the action of SU(2) also satisfies

The adjoint operator M1* defined by

satisfies

The adjoint M0*, defined by averaging M*f over SO(2), satisfies

for SU(2)-invariant functions F and SO(2)-invariant functions f. It follows that

The function

is SO(2)-invariant and satisfies

On the other hand,

since the integral can be computed by integrating  around the rectangular indented contour with vertices at ±R and ±R + πi. Thus the eigenfunction

satisfies the normalisation condition φλ(i) = 1. There can only be one such solution either because the Wronskian of the ordinary differential equation must vanish or by expanding as a power series in sinh r. It follows that

Similarly it follows that

then

Taking f=M1*F, the SL(2, C) inversion formula for F immediately yields

As for SL(2,C), this immediately implies the Plancherel formula for fi in Cc(SL(2,R) / SO(2)):

The spherical function φλ is an eigenfunction of the Laplacian:

Schwartz functions on R are the spherical transforms of functions f belonging to the Harish-Chandra Schwartz space

The spherical transforms of smooth SO(2)-invariant functions of compact support are precisely functions on R which are restrictions of holomorphic functions on C satisfying an exponential growth condition

Both these results can be deduced by descent from the corresponding results for SL(2,C), by verifying directly that the spherical transform satisfies the given growth conditions and then using the relation .

The representation is given by the formula

The function

is fixed by SO(2) and

The representations πλ are irreducible and unitarily equivalent only when the sign of λ is changed. The map  with measure  on the first factor, is given by the formula

Flensted–Jensen's method of descent

Flensted–Jensen's method uses the centraliser of SO(2) in SL(2,C) which splits as a direct product of SO(2) and the 1-parameter subgroup K1 of matrices

The symmetric space SL(2,C)/SU(2) can be identified with the space H3 of positive 2×2 matrices A with determinant 1

with the group action given by

Thus

So on the hyperboloid , gt only changes the coordinates y and a. Similarly the action of SO(2) acts by rotation on the coordinates (b,x) leaving a and y unchanged. The space H2 of real-valued positive matrices A with y = 0 can be identified with the orbit of the identity matrix under SL(2,R). Taking coordinates (b,x,y) in H3 and (b,x) on H2 the volume and area elements are given by

where r2 equals b2 + x2 + y2 or b2 + x2,

The Laplacian operators are given by the formula

where

and

For an SU(2)-invariant function F on H3 and an SO(2)-invariant function on H2, regarded as functions of r or t,

If f(b,x) is a function on H2, Ef is defined by

Thus

If f is SO(2)-invariant, then, regarding f as a function of r or t,

On the other hand,

Thus, setting Sf(t) = f(2t),

leading to the fundamental descent relation of Flensted-Jensen for M0 = ES:

The same relation holds with M0 by M, where Mf is obtained by averaging M0f over SU(2).

The extension Ef is constant in the y variable and therefore invariant under the transformations gs. On the other hand, for F a suitable function on H3, the function QF defined by

is independent of the y variable. A straightforward change of variables shows that

Since K1 commutes with SO(2), QF is SO(2)--invariant if F is, in particular if F is SU(2)-invariant. In this case QF is a function of r or t, so that M*F can be defined by

The integral formula above then yields

and hence, since for f SO(2)-invariant,

the following adjoint formula:

As a consequence

Thus, as in the case of Hadamard's method of descent.

with

and

It follows that

Taking f=M*F, the SL(2,C) inversion formula for F then immediately yields

Abel's integral equation

The spherical function φλ is given by

so that

Thus

so that defining F by

the spherical transform can be written

The relation between F and f is classically inverted by the Abel integral equation:

In fact

Hence

This gives the spherical inversion for the point i. Now for fixed g in SL(2,R) define

On the other hand, for biinvariant functions f,

so that

where w = g(i). Combining this with the above inversion formula for f1 yields the general spherical inversion formula:

Other special cases
All complex semisimple Lie groups or the Lorentz groups SO0(N,1) with N odd can be treated directly by reduction to the usual Fourier transform. The remaining real Lorentz groups can be deduced by Flensted-Jensen's method of descent, as can other semisimple Lie groups of real rank one. Flensted-Jensen's method of descent also applies to the treatment of real semisimple Lie groups for which the Lie algebras are normal real forms of complex semisimple Lie algebras.

The approach of  applies to a wide class of real semisimple Lie groups of arbitrary real rank and yields the explicit product form of the Plancherel measure on * without using Harish-Chandra's expansion of the spherical functions φλ
in terms of his c-function, discussed below. Although less general, it gives a simpler approach to the Plancherel theorem for this class of groups.

Complex semisimple Lie groups

If G is a complex semisimple Lie group, it is the complexification of its maximal compact subgroup U, a compact semisimple Lie group.

there is the Cartan decomposition:

The corresponding character formula and dimension formula of Hermann Weyl give explicit formulas for

Moreover,

There is a similar product formula for d(λ), a polynomial in λ.

On the complex group G, the integral of a U-biinvariant function F can be evaluated as

where .

They are the matrix coefficients of the irreducible spherical principal series of G induced from the character of the Borel subgroup of G corresponding to λ; these representations are irreducible and can all be realized on L2(U/T).

The spherical transform of a U-biinvariant function F is given by

and the spherical inversion formula by

where  is a Weyl chamber. In fact the result follows from the Fourier inversion formula on  since

Note that the symmetric space G/U has as compact dual the compact symmetric space U x U / U, where U is the diagonal subgroup.

and the spherical inversion formula now follows from the theory of Fourier series on T:

There is an evident duality between these formulas and those for the non-compact dual.

Real semisimple Lie groups

Let G0 be a normal real form of the complex semisimple Lie group G, the fixed points of an involution σ, conjugate linear on the Lie algebra of G. Let τ be a Cartan involution of G0 extended to an involution of G, complex linear on its Lie algebra, chosen to commute with σ. The fixed point subgroup of τσ is a compact real form U of G, intersecting G0 in a maximal compact subgroup K0. The fixed point subgroup of τ is K, the complexification of K0. Let G0= K0·P0 be the corresponding Cartan decomposition of G0 and let A be a maximal Abelian subgroup of P0.  proved that

where A+ is the image of the closure of a Weyl chamber in  under the exponential map. Moreover,

Since

it follows that there is a canonical identification between K \ G / U, K0 \ G0 /K0 and A+.

Here a third Cartan decomposition of G = UAU has been used to identify U \ G / U with A+.

Let Δ be the Laplacian on G0/K0 and let Δc be the Laplacian on G/U. Then

Then M and M* satisfy the duality relations

In particular

There is a similar compatibility for other operators in the center of the universal enveloping algebra of G0. It follows from the eigenfunction characterisation of spherical functions that  is proportional to φλ on G0, the constant of proportionality being given by

Moreover, in this case

If f = M*F, then the spherical inversion formula for F on G implies that for f on G0:

since

Harish-Chandra's Plancherel theorem
Let G be a noncompact connected real semisimple Lie group with finite center. Let  denote its Lie algebra. Let K be a maximal compact subgroup
given as the subgroup of fixed points of a Cartan involution σ.

With respect to this inner product, the restricted roots Σ give a root system. A choice of positive roots defines a Weyl chamber . The reduced root system Σ0 consists of roots α such that α/2 is not a root.

The spherical inversion formula states that

where Harish-Chandra's c-function c(λ) is defined by

The Plancherel theorem for spherical functions states that the map

Harish-Chandra's spherical function expansion

L can be expressed in terms of these operators by the formula

and

Thus

where

so that L can be regarded as a perturbation of the constant-coefficient operator L0.

Now the spherical function φλ is an eigenfunction of the Laplacian:

Since eiλ–ρ and its transforms under W are eigenfunctions of L0 with the same eigenvalue, it is natural look for a formula for φλ in terms of a perturbation series

with Λ the cone of all non-negative integer combinations of positive roots, and the transforms of fλ under W. The expansion

leads to a recursive formula for the coefficients aμ(λ). In particular they are uniquely determined and the

It follows that φλ can be expressed in terms as a linear combination of fλ and its transforms under W:

Here c(λ) is Harish-Chandra's c-function.

Harish-Chandra obtained a second integral formula for φλ and hence c(λ) using the Bruhat decomposition of G:

where B = MAN and the union is disjoint. Taking the Coxeter element s0 of W, the unique element mapping  onto , it follows that σ(N) has a dense open orbit G/B = K/M whose complement is a union of cells of strictly smaller dimension and therefore has measure zero. It follows that the integral formula
for φλ initially defined over K/M

can be transferred to σ(N):

Since

Harish-Chandra's c-function

These operators exhibit the unitary equivalence between πλ and πsλ for s in the Weyl group and a c-function cs(λ) can be attached to each such operator: namely the value at 1 of the intertwining operator applied to ξ0, the constant function 1, in L2(K/M). Equivalently, since ξ0 is up to scalar multiplication the unique vector fixed by K, it is an eigenvector of the intertwining operator with eigenvalue cs(λ).
These operators all act on the same space L2(K/M), which can be identified with the representation induced from the 1-dimensional representation defined by λ on MAN.

where σ is the Cartan involution. It satisfies the intertwining relation

The key property of the intertwining operators and their integrals is the multiplicative cocycle property

whenever

for the length function on the Weyl group associated with the choice of Weyl chamber. For s in W, this is the number of chambers crossed by the straight line segment between X and sX for any point X in the interior of the chamber. The unique element of greatest length s0, namely the number of positive restricted roots, is the unique element that carries the Weyl chamber  onto . By Harish-Chandra's integral formula, it corresponds to Harish-Chandra's c-function:

The c-functions are in general defined by the equation

where ξ0 is the constant function 1 in L2(K/M). The cocycle property of the intertwining operators implies a similar multiplicative property for the c-functions:

provided

In fact the integral involves only the closed connected subgroup Gα corresponding to the Lie subalgebra generated by  where α lies in Σ0+. Then Gα is a real semisimple Lie group with real rank one, i.e. dim Aα = 1, and cs is just the Harish-Chandra c-function of Gα. In this case the c-function can be computed directly by various means:

by noting that φλ can be expressed in terms of the hypergeometric function for which the asymptotic expansion is known from the classical formulas of Gauss for the connection coefficients;
by directly computing the integral, which can be expressed as an integral in two variables and hence a product of two beta functions.

This yields the following formula:

where

The general Gindikin–Karpelevich formula for c(λ) is an immediate consequence of this formula and the multiplicative properties of cs(λ).

Paley–Wiener theorem
The Paley-Wiener theorem generalizes the classical Paley-Wiener theorem by characterizing the spherical transforms of smooth K-bivariant functions of compact support on G. It is a necessary and sufficient condition that the spherical transform be W-invariant and that there is an R > 0 such that for each N there is an estimate

In this case f is supported in the closed ball of radius R about the origin in G/K.

This was proved by Helgason and Gangolli ( pg. 37).

The theorem was later proved by  independently of the spherical inversion theorem, using a modification of his method of reduction to the complex case.

Rosenberg's proof of inversion formula
 noticed that the Paley-Wiener theorem and the spherical inversion theorem could be proved simultaneously, by a trick which considerably simplified previous proofs.

The first step of his proof consists in showing directly that the inverse transform, defined using Harish-Chandra's c-function, defines a function supported in the closed ball of radius R about the origin if the Paley-Wiener estimate is satisfied. This follows
Using Harish-Chandra's expansion
of φλ and the formulas for c'''(λ) in terms of Gamma functions, the integral can be bounded for t large and hence can be shown to vanish outside the closed ball of radius R about the origin.

This part of the Paley-Wiener theorem shows that

defines a distribution on G/K with support at the origin o. A further estimate for the integral shows that it is in fact given by a measure and that therefore there is a constant C such that

By applying this result to

it follows that

Schwartz functions
The Harish-Chandra Schwartz space can be defined as

Under the spherical transform it is mapped onto  the space of W-invariant
Schwartz functions on 

The original proof of Harish-Chandra was a long argument by induction.  found a short and simple proof, allowing the result to be deduced directly from versions of the Paley-Wiener and spherical inversion formula. He proved that the spherical transform of a Harish-Chandra Schwartz function is a classical Schwartz function. His key observation was then to show that the inverse transform was continuous on the Paley-Wiener space endowed with classical Schwartz space seminorms, using classical estimates.

Notes

References

, Appendix to Chapter VI, The Plancherel Formula for Complex Semisimple Lie Groups''.

, section 21.

 (a general introduction for physicists)

.

Representation theory of Lie groups
Theorems in harmonic analysis
Theorems in functional analysis